This is a list of Bien de Interés Cultural landmarks in Asturias, Spain.

 Balsera Palace
 Camposagrado Palace (Oviedo)
 Capilla de Santa Eugenia de Sobrecueva
 Capilla de Santo Medero (Isongo)
 Castle of Soto (Aller)
 Chao Samartín
 Church of St. Felix, El Pino
 Church of San Esteban (Ciaño)
 Church of San Esteban de Aramil
 Church of San Jorge (Manzaneda)
 Church of San Juan de Berbío
 Church of San Juan Apóstol y Evangelista, Santianes de Pravia
 Church of San Martín de Luiña
 Church of San Pedro de Nora
 Church of Santa Eulalia de la Lloraza
 Church of Santa Eulalia de Ujo
 Church of Santa María de Bendones
 Church of Santa María de Celón
 Church of Santa María de Junco
 Church of Santa María de Llas
 Church of Santa María de Sabada
 Church of Santa María de Sariegomuerto
 Church of Santa María de Villanueva
 Church of San Salvador de Priesca
 Church of San Salvador de Valdediós
 Church of Santiago de Gobiendes
 Church of Santo Adriano de Tuñón
 Church of the Monastery of San Miguel de Bárcena
 Colegiata de San Pedro de Teverga
 Colegiata de Santa María la Mayor (Salas)
 Colegiata de Santa María Magdalena
 Colombres (Ribadedeva)
 Cudillero
 Díaz Inguanzo Palace
 Ermita de la Magdalena (Monsacro)
 Ferrera Palace
 Gobiendes Palace
 Hermitage of Santa Cristina
 Iglesia de San Andrés (Bedriñana)
 Iglesia de San Andrés (Valdebárzana)
 Iglesia de San Emeterio (Sietes)
 Iglesia de San Esteban (Sograndio)
 Iglesia de Santa Eulalia (Selorio)
 Iglesia de San Juan (Amandi)
 Iglesia de San Juan (Camoca)
 Iglesia de San Juan (Priorio)
 Iglesia de San Nicolás (Villoria)
 Iglesia de San Pedro (Mestas de Con)
 Iglesia de San Salvador (Fuentes)
 Iglesia de Santo Tomás (Coro)
 Iglesia de San Vicente (Serrapio)
 Iglesia de Santa Cecilia (Careñes)
 Iglesia de Santa Eulalia (Abamia)
 Iglesia de Santa María (Arbazal)
 Iglesia de Santa María (Luanco)
 Iglesia de Santa María (Lugás)
 Iglesia de Santa María (Piedeloro)
 Iglesia de Santa María (Sebrayo)
 Iglesia de Santa María (Tanes)
 Iglesia de Santa María (Villamayor)
 Iglesia de Santa María de la Oliva (Villaviciosa)
 Iglesia de Santa María del Conceyu (Llanes)
 Iglesia de Santa Marina (Puerto de Vega)
 Iglesia de Santiago (Arlós)
 Iglesia de Santiago el Mayor (Sariego)
 Iglesia de Santo Tomás de Cantorbery (Avilés)
 La Foncalada
 Las Caldas cave
 Maqua Palace
 Mayorazgo Palace
 Miranda Palace
 Monasterio de Santa María de Valdediós
 Monasterio de San Martín de Salas
 Monasterio de San Salvador (Cornellana)
 Monastery of Santa María de Villanueva de Oscos
 Monastery of San Pedro de Villanueva
 Monastery of San Vicente de Oviedo
 Muniellos Nature Reserve
 Museum of Fine Arts of Asturias
 Oviedo Cathedral
 Palacio de Doriga
 Palace of Cienfuegos de Peñalba
 Palace of la Espriella en Villahormes
 Palacio Valdés Theatre
 Plaza de Toros de El Bibio
 Royal Collegiate church of San Fernando
 San Antolín de Bedón (Llanes)
 San Isidoro, Oviedo
 San Juan Bautista de Corias
 San Julián de los Prados
 San Miguel de Lillo
 San Tirso, Oviedo
 Santa Cueva de Covadonga
 Santa María del Naranco
 Santo Domingo, Oviedo
 Sidrón Cave
 Tito Bustillo Cave
 Tower of Llanes
 Villaviciosa

References 

 
Asturias